Inga Sæland (born 3 August 1959) is an Icelandic law graduate and politician who is the founder and current leader of the People's Party.

Early life
Inga was born in Ólafsfjörður to Ástvaldur Einar Steinsson (born 21 August 1930), a fisherman, and Sigríður Sæland Jónsdóttir (born 25 June 1937), a housewife. She moved to Reykjavík in 1994. She got a BA in law and a partial degree in political science from the University of Iceland. She has a visual impairment and her political party's goals have been to better the conditions of the poor and disabled.

References 

1959 births
Living people
Icelandic disability rights activists
Inga Saeland
Leaders of political parties in Iceland
Inga Saeland
Inga Saeland
Inga Saeland